The Keltenmuseum  in Hallein near Salzburg contains major discoveries from the La Tene period of the Iron Age  which come from burials in the area surrounding the nearby Hallein Salt Mine (Salzbergwerk Dürrnberg), at Dürrnberg. The Museum was founded in 1882 and was housed in the Bürgerspital. In 1930 it was moved into the Rathaus and from 1952 occupied a gateway of the town or stadt's fortifications.  In 1970 the name was changed to Keltenmuseum and the museum was moved into the former Salt Offices (Saline Hallein) on the Pflegerplatz, which fronts the river Salzach. In 1980 the Museum staged a major exhibition "Die Kelten in Mitteleuropa" (The Celts in Central Europe), which demonstrated the wealth of discoveries that were being made at the Hallein. 
In 1993-4 the Austrian architect Heinz Tesar drew up plans for the conversion and extension of the Museum and on 1 January 2012 the Museum became a constituent part of Salzburg Museum.

The Salt Office and the Saline Hallein
The building dates from the mid-18th century and in the Salt Office, now the top floor of the Museum,  are a series of rooms, including the Prince's Chamber and Green Room, which have a series of 80 paintings by the artist Benedict Werkstötter, which illustrate the various processes of salt production. These were specially commissioned following a visit by the Prince- Bishop Sigismund von Schrattenbach in 1757. The Prince-Archbishops of Salzburg derived much of their wealth from the mining of salt at Hallein, although in 1732-4, 780 of the miners, who were protestants, were forced to leave Hallein because of their religious beliefs. In 1816, following the inclusion of Salzburgerland into the Habsburg Empire the office was amalgamated with the other Austrian salt production centres

Paintings in Salt Office

Salt Mining in the Hallein Area
The richest deposits of salt in central Europe are concentrated in at short distance from each other in the Eastern Alps, in the Salzburg and Salzkammergut areas. The mines of Hallstatt, Hallein-Durrnberg and Bad Reichenhall are close together, with those at Bad Aussee further to the east. Mining at Halstatt started in the later Bronze Age and reached its peak during the Hallstatt phase of the Iron Age (c750-480BC). At Hallein-Durrnberg mining started later at the end of the Hallstatt period and the two mines co-existed for about 200 years. Mining at Hallstatt at ceased suddenly around 400BC. It is thought that some sort of natural disaster, possibly the flooding of the mines, stopped the salt-mining at Hallstatt. The evidence of wealth from the Hallein-Durrnberg cemeteries suggest that for most of the La Tene period the mines flourished, but around 100BC the mines went into decline and production seems to have moved to Reichensall.

Salt mining was re-established at Hallein by 1198 AD when a salt pan is mentioned at "Meulpach" . Under the Archbishops of Salzburg during the Middle Ages, Hallein became the major centre of production in the Eastern Alps and salt routes developed up the Salzach and particularly to Bohemia. In the 18th and early 19th centuries Hallein lost its trade with Bavaria and Bohemia.  In 1854/62 a new saline conditioning plant was built on Perner Island, which is in the Salzach opposite the Keltenmuseum. Then in 1954/55 a new thermo-compression plant was added. However, with the rationalization of Austrian Salt production in 1989, these plants were closed and salt extraction ceased.  The Dürrnberg mine exists now only as a Tourist attraction, together with the Celtic Village Open Air Museum.

The Burials on display in the Keltenmuseum

Iron Age burials have been found over a large area around the Salt Mine at Dürrnberg since the 16th century. In more recent times an excavation of a robbed burial mound in 1932 produced a spectacular bronze wine flagon. This was previously on display in Salzburg Museum, but is now at the Keltenmuseum. In the 1960s Ernst Penninger started his excavations at the Moserstein, producing a series of very rich burials of the final phase of the Hallstatt period and the earlier La Tène period. This has been followed by excavations at Lettenbühel, Kranzbichl and Simonsbauerfeld.
The most important burials are:

Grave 39, Moserstein
Double Grave Celtic grave 39 ( 410-370 BC ) at Moserstein with Helmet and shield

Grave 44, Moserstein
Fürstengrab "Grave of a prince" 44 at Moserstein.  (4th century BC ). Excavated in 1959. Evidence for a two-wheeled chariot. The 'princely' warrior was buried with a wooden jug that had bronze mounts, one of which is the stylised Celtic head which is used as the logo of the Keltenmuseum. There was also a spouted bronze pilgrim flask, which could hold 17 litres of wine and a bucket or [situla] shaped vessel which could hold around 200 litres, inside which was an Athenian pottery kylix  which can be dated to around 470BC. At the feet of this warrior was his pointed bronze helmet, of typical La Tène type, an Iron sword, a bow and arrow and three lances. A small gold model of a boat with two oars is symbolic of the journey to the afterlife

Grave 67
Amber Necklace

Grave 68
Celtic jewellery, including an amber ring pearl ( 500-460 BC ), from grave 68 at Eislfeld.

Grave 112
The magnificent decorated Celtic bronze Dürrnberg Flagon (Ger. 'Schnabelkanne') of the 5th century BC, was originally in the collection of the Museum Carolino-Augusteum in Salzburg, but has now been transferred to the Keltenmuseum. There are two immediate parallels to this jug, the pair of flagons in the British Museum from a probable burial at Basse-Yutz in the French Moselle Valley. These vessels essentially copy Greek and Etruscan jugs, with added Celtic Zoomorphic art. In the case of the Hallein jug, there is evidence of Scythian influence. The burial mound was excavated in 1932 and was found to be largely robbed out, but there was evidence for a two-wheeled chariot similar to that found in grave 44 on the Moserstein and the jug was also found. and the discovery was reported in the Illustrated London News in 1936. The jug was studied in 1944 by Paul Jacobsthal in his 'Early Celtic Art'.

Grave 253, Simonsbauerfeld.
Double burial Simonsbauerfeld

Grave 317, Lettenbühel
Celtic bowl ( 350-330 BC ), from grave 317 at Lettenbühel.

Grave 346, Kranzbichl.
Fragment of an Etruscan situla, from grave 346 at Kranzbichl.

Grave 352
Birch Bark Hat. A similar hat to this was also found in the Hochdorf Chieftain's Grave

Grave 353

Gallery of other discoveries and Replicas/Reconstructions

See also
Celts
Hochdorf Chieftain's Grave
Heuneburg
Glauberg
Oppidum of Manching
Oppidum
Vix and Mont Lassois
Hallstatt Museum

References

Literature
 Ernst Penninger 'Geschichte der archäologischen Forschung auf dem Dürrnberg' in  "Pauli" 1980 pp150–158
Ernst Penninger 'Hallein: La Tombe 44 du Dürrnberg In Tresors des Princes Celtes Galeries nationales du grand Palais, 1987, Paris. pp 232-243
Fritz Moosleitner 'The Dürrnberg near Hallein: A Center of Celtic Art and Culture', in V.Kruta et al. (eds)"The Celts" Thames & Hudson, London, 1991, pp167–173.
Ernst Penninger "Der Dürrnberg bei Hallein", I, Munich 1972
Fritz Moosleitner et al.,"Der Dürrnberg bei Hallein", II, Munich 1974
Ludvig Pauli,  "Der Dürrnberg bei Hallein", III, Munich 1978

External links

A timeline of Hallein salt mining can be found at http://www.salzwelten.at/en/hallein/saltmine/history/

Museums in Salzburg (state)
Iron Age Austria
Hallein
Duchy of Salzburg